Penderlea Homesteads Historic District is a national historic district located near Willard, Pender County, North Carolina. The district encompasses 186 contributing buildings, two contributing sites, and nine contributing structures in a rural section of Pender County.  The district includes a collection of community buildings and houses constructed as part of the Penderlea Homesteads New Deal project. It includes 88 one-story, frame dwellings constructed as part of the original homestead project.  Penderlea was the first experimental farm-city colony established by the United States government through the United States Department of the Interior’s Division of Subsistence Homesteads.

It was listed on the National Register of Historic Places in 2013.

References

External links

Historic districts on the National Register of Historic Places in North Carolina
Art Deco architecture in North Carolina
Buildings and structures in Pender County, North Carolina
National Register of Historic Places in Pender County, North Carolina
New Deal in North Carolina